The Mansyū Ki-98, (also written as Manshū Ki-98), was a  Japanese ground-attack aircraft proposed by Mansyū (Manshūkoku Hikōki K.K. - Manchuria Airplane Manufacturing Company Ltd.) during World War II for use by the Imperial Japanese Army Air Force. The still unassembled components of the first prototype were deliberately destroyed before Japan surrendered.

Design and development
By late 1942, the Imperial Japanese Army Air Force issued requirements for new combat aircraft, including a ground attack aircraft. Kawasaki proposed the Kawasaki Ki-102 and Mansyū the Ki-98. The Ki-98 was to have been a single-seat, twin-boom, low-wing monoplane with a central nacelle housing both the cockpit and a turbosupercharged 1,643-kilowatt (2,200-hp) Mitsubishi Ha-211 Ru radial engine behind the pilot driving a four-bladed pusher propeller rotating between the booms. The underslung booms extended aft from slightly forward of the leading edge of the wing with ovoid fins supporting the tailplane and elevator between them. The aircraft had a retractable tricycle landing gear, bubble canopy, and an armament of one 37-mm and two 20-mm cannon mounted in the nose. Entry to the cockpit was to have been through a door in the nose undercarriage bay.

In the spring of 1944, the Army Air Force instructed Mansyū to adapt the design as a high-altitude fighter. The major change being the engine, substituting the turbocharged Mitsubishi Ha-211 Ru for the original Ha-211 III. The increased bulk of the new engine requiring the fuselage to be enlarged and the larger diameter propeller necessitated moving the booms outboard.

Construction of the first prototype was delayed by bombing raids on the Harbin factory till January 1945. Components for the first prototype was still under construction and hadn't been assembled when the Soviet Union invaded Manchuria in August 1945; the Manchukuo Imperial Army ordered all documentation and material to be destroyed to prevent capture by Soviet forces, bringing the Ki-98 project to an end.

Specifications (Ki-98 estimated)

See also

References

Notes

Bibliography

 Francillon, René J. Japanese Aircraft of the Pacific War. Annapolis, Maryland: Naval Institute Press, 1979. .

External links
Artist's impression at j-aircraft.com
Erdal Can Alkoçlar

Ki-98, Mansyu
Ki-98
Ki-98, Mansyu
Ki-98, Mansyu
Single-engined pusher aircraft